All asset management companies (AMC) in Malaysia are overseen by the Malaysian Investment Development Authority (MIDA). AMC is generally an asset management / investment management company/firm that invests the pooled funds of investors in securities in line with the stated investment objectives.

Enforced by SC
The Securities Commission Malaysia (SC) is the enforcer of the available legislation in the asset management industry. The following Acts are the most important in terms of regulatory framework regarding trusts in Malaysia: the Securities Commission Act, the Capital Markets, and Services Act, the Securities Industry Act or the Futures Securities Act.

Asset management companies in Malaysia are subject to a set of rules imposed by the Securities Commission. In the development of their activities, they must have a supervision and control system, act in the best interest of their clients, and have a good business conduct.

Investment fee in Malaysia
AMC in Malaysia provide their investment services for a fee. They charge commission fees for each transaction you make. That means that when you buy shares, you get charged. When you sell your shares, you also get charged.

For a fee, the company/firm provides more diversification, liquidity, and professional management consulting services than are normally available to individual investors. The diversification of portfolio is done by investing in such securities which are inversely correlated to each other. Money is collected from investors by way of floating various collective investment schemes, e.g. mutual fund schemes. In general, an AMC is a company that is engaged primarily in the business of investing in, and managing, portfolios of securities.

Largest companies
The following is a list of the top AMCs located in Malaysia (as of 2018):

List of AMCs within S.E.A

Asia

 Aberdeen Asset Management
 Aberdeen Standard Investments
 Affin Hwang Asset Management Berhad
 Asia Frontier Capital Ltd.
 Capital Dynamics
 Conning & Company
 IDFC Project Equity
 Investcorp
 Mirae Asset Group
 Nomura Group
 Standard Life Aberdeen
 SinoPac Financial Holdings
 Value Partners

Australia

 Aberdeen Asset Management
 Aberdeen Standard Investments
 Standard Life Aberdeen
 AMP Capital
 Macquarie Group

See also
 List of investment banks
 List of private equity firms

Notes and references

External links
 Asset Management Company (AMC) Definition | Investopedia

Finance lists
Lists of financial services companies

Asset management